Samasundara Palem is a village in Guntur district of Andhra Pradesh.

References

Villages in Guntur district